Lorraine is a city in Ellsworth County, Kansas, United States.  As of the 2020 census, the population of the city was 137.

History
Lorraine was founded in 1888.

The first post office in Lorraine was established in February, 1888.

Geography
Lorraine is located at  (38.569623, -98.317467).

Demographics

2010 census
As of the census of 2010, there were 138 people, 47 households, and 40 families residing in the city. The racial makeup of the city was 93.5% White, 0.7% Native American, 1.4% from other races, and 4.3% from two or more races. Hispanic or Latino of any race were 11.6% of the population.

There were 47 households, of which 36.2% had children under the age of 18 living with them, 74.5% were married couples living together, 8.5% had a female householder with no husband present, 2.1% had a male householder with no wife present, and 14.9% were non-families. 8.5% of all households were made up of individuals. The average household size was 2.94 and the average family size was 3.10.

The median age in the city was 40.5 years. 30.4% of residents were under the age of 18; 5.7% were between the ages of 18 and 24; 17.3% were from 25 to 44; 30.4% were from 45 to 64; and 15.9% were 65 years of age or older. The gender makeup of the city was 52.2% male and 47.8% female.

2000 census
As of the census of 2000, there were 136 people, 50 households, and 41 families residing in the city. The racial makeup of the city was 95.59% White, 3.68% African American, and 0.74% from two or more races. Hispanic or Latino of any race were 3.68% of the population.

There were 50 households, out of which 38.0% had children under the age of 18 living with them, 74.0% were married couples living together, 8.0% had a female householder with no husband present, and 18.0% were non-families. 16.0% of all households were made up of individuals, and 4.0% had someone living alone who was 65 years of age or older. The average household size was 2.72 and the average family size was 3.05.

In the city, the population was spread out, with 28.7% under the age of 18, 6.6% from 18 to 24, 27.2% from 25 to 44, 20.6% from 45 to 64, and 16.9% who were 65 years of age or older. The median age was 39 years. For every 100 females, there were 103.0 males. For every 100 females age 18 and over, there were 98.0 males.

The median income for a household in the city was $34,167, and the median income for a family was $35,417. Males had a median income of $29,375 versus $17,813 for females. The per capita income for the city was $13,576. None of the population and none of the families were below the poverty line.

Government
The Lorraine government consists of a mayor and five council members.  The council meets the 3rd Tuesday of each month at 7PM.
 City Hall, 239 Main St.

Education
The community is served by Central Plains USD 112 public school district.  The Central Plains High School mascot is Central Plains Oilers. The Oilers won the Kansas State High School 8-Man DII football championship in 2014.

Lorraine schools were closed through school unification. The Lorraine High School mascot was Lorraine Huskies.

References

Further reading

External links
 Lorraine - Directory of Public Officials
 Ellsworth County maps: Current, Historic, KDOT

Cities in Kansas
Cities in Ellsworth County, Kansas